Pielnia  (Pel’nia) is a village in the administrative district of Gmina Zarszyn, within Sanok County, Subcarpathian Voivodeship, in south-eastern Poland.

The village has a population of 990.

References

Pielnia